Iddaru Mitrulu may refer to:
 Iddaru Mitrulu (1961 film)
 Iddaru Mitrulu (1999 film), a 1999 Tollywood film directed by K. Raghavendra Rao